The execution van, also called a mobile execution unit, was developed by the government of the People's Republic of China (PRC) and was first used in 1997. The prisoner is strapped to a stretcher and executed inside the van. The van allows death sentences to be carried out without moving the prisoner to an execution ground.

The vans also require less staffing, requiring four people to assist with the injection and are mobile. The PRC states that the vans are more humane than previous forms of execution. In 2004, Amnesty International predicted that the execution rate in China would increase because of mobile capital punishment. However, the number of executions dropped steadily in the 2000s, and significantly since 2007, when the Supreme People's Court regained the power to review all death sentences. Human rights groups have reported that China carries out the highest number of executions of any country. The Dui Hua Foundation put the number at 5,000 to 6,000 for 2007 and 2,400 for 2013, and in 2019, Amnesty International reported that mainland China executes more people than all other countries combined.

People's Republic of China
Unlike the United States, where lethal injections are used, Chinese executions have been carried out by shooting, although the state is attempting to shift toward lethal injections. Because demand is high and the facilities can be expensive, the state deploys special police buses designed to administer the injection. After the 1997 decision to legalize lethal injection as a form of execution, PRC officials began using execution vans across China. Becoming popular in 2007, these officials state that the vans are cost-effective by allowing communities without the money to build dedicated death rows to kill prisoners without the costs associated with sending prisoners away for death. In 2006, former Chinese judge and current lawyer Qiu Xingsheng argues that "some places can't afford the cost of sending a person to Beijing—perhaps $250—plus $125 more for the drug." Because Beijing is the only place where the drug is manufactured, the vans have allowed localities to administer the death sentence where the crime took place. Estimates place the number of execution vans in operation at around 40; the PRC has not confirmed this number.

A converted 24-seat bus, the execution van keeps the appearance of a normal police van on the outside with no markings indicating its purpose. The rear of the vehicle houses a windowless chamber where the execution takes place. Several cameras are present and feed closed-circuit televisions in the front of the van; a recording can be made if desired. The bed itself slides out of the wall under its own power, on which the convicted person is strapped down. A syringe is put into the arm by a technician and a police official administers the injection by pressing a button.

Organ harvesting

Execution vans are a procurement part of the Chinese organ trade. In 2012, it was estimated that 65% of transplanted organs came from executed prisoners, many of whom were executed in vans to meet the high demand for organs. Activists claim that the bodies are quickly cremated, which makes it impossible for family members to determine if organs have in fact been removed.

Controversy
The PRC government claims that this is a more humane form of killing people, being far less painful than firing squad executions. Zhao Shijie, president of the Yunnan Provincial High Court, was quoted as praising the new system: "The use of lethal injection shows that China's death penalty system is becoming more civilized and humane." While the vans have moved China away from previous days of large public executions, human rights activists counter that they are "like government-sanctioned death squads", and allow for an increased number and a higher efficiency of executions.

Notable executions
On December 22, 2003, organized crime leader Liu Yong was executed in an execution van in a controversial ruling. Liu was convicted of 32 charges and sentenced to death in 2000, but was granted a reprieve after appealing the case on the grounds that his confession was forced. Liu had been given a retrial by the Supreme Court on December 17. It was the first time the Supreme Court had bypassed China's two-trial system in which two trials are permitted and the verdict of the second trial may be appealed by either side.

On March 17, 2006, billionaire Yuan Baojing was executed in a van for the arranged murder of a blackmailer.

The former Director of the State Food and Drug Administration of the People's Republic of China Zheng Xiaoyu was executed in an execution van on July 10, 2007, for corruption. Zheng tried to appeal the sentence, but the court ruled that he was a "great danger" to the country and its reputation.

See also
 Capital punishment
 Capital punishment in the People's Republic of China
 Gas van
 Prison bus
 Police bus

References

Capital punishment in China
Execution equipment
Execution methods